The Archdeacon of Carlisle is a senior ecclesiastical officer within the Diocese of Carlisle. The archdeacon is responsible for some pastoral care and discipline of the clergy in the ancient archdeaconry of Carlisle. Sources would seem to indicate that the archdeaconry was created at the same time as the diocese; it was first split seven centuries later on 31 August 1847 with the creation of the Westmorland archdeaconry.

List of archdeacons

High Medieval
bef. 1133–bef. 1151: Elias
bef. 1151–aft. 1166: Robert
bef. 1190–aft. 1194: Peter de Ros
–aft. 1208: Aimeric (also Archdeacon of Durham)
18 November 1203: Alexander de Lucy (ineffective royal grant)
aft. 1208–aft. 1223: G. de Lascy
aft. 1223–aft. 1234: Gervase de Louther
bef. 1238–aft. 1238: Robert de Otrington
bef. 1244–aft. 1255: Walter de Ulceby
bef. 1263–bef. 1267: Michael de Hamsted
bef. 1267–aft. 1267: N.
bef. –aft. : H.
bef. –aft. : Nicholas de Lewelin
bef. 1285–aft. 1299: Richard de Lyth/de Whitby

Late Medieval
21 November 1302–bef. 1311 (d.): Peter de Insula/Lisle
26 November 1311 – 12 March 1318 (res.): Gilbert de Halton
27 June 1318–bef. 1320: Thomas de Caldebeck
27 December 1320–bef. 1322: Henry de Carlisle
bef. 1322–aft. 1340: William de Kendal
aft. 1340–bef. 1350 (d.): William de Briseban
bef. 1350–aft. 1350: John Marescal
1350–bef. 1355: William de Savinhaco
bef. 1355–May 1364 (d.): William Rothbury
18 May 1364 – 19 October 1379 (res.): John de Appleby
bef. 1379–bef. 1391: Thomas Felton
bef. 1391–bef. 1405: Thomas de Karlel
bef. 1405–bef. 1410: Thomas Strickland
13 December 1410–bef. 1415: John Burdett
bef. 1415–bef. 1423 (d.): John de Kirkby
bef. 1428–bef. 1437: Alexander Cok
bef. 1437–bef. 1448: Richard Hervey
bef. 1448–30 January 1450 (res.): Nicholas Close
bef. 1452–1470 (d.): Stephen Close
bef. 1463–1465 (res.): George Neville
bef. 1490–1509 (d.): Hugh Dacre
bef. 1510–bef. 1520: Cuthbert Conyers
bef. 1520–aft. 1530: William Bourbank
bef. 1534–aft. 1547: William Holgill

Early modern
bef. 1558–1567 (d.): George Neville
11 March 1568 – 1588 (d.): Edward Threlkeld
8 October 1588 – 3 June 1597 (res.): Henry Dethick
8 June 1597 – 10 November 1599 (res.): Richard Pilkington
6 February 1600 – 17 June 1602 (res.): Giles Robinson
18 June 1602–bef. 1604 (res.): Nicholas Deane
3 February 1604–bef. 1621 (d.): George Warwick
–bef. 1623 (d.): Robert Wright
15 January 1623–bef. 1643 (d.): Isaac Singleton
?–bef. 1660 (res.): Peter Wentworth
14 November 1660–bef. 1667 (d.): Lewis West
28 November 1667 – 13 March 1669 (res.): John Peachell
23 March 1669 – 29 September 1682 (res.): Thomas Musgrave
3 October 1682 – 1702 (res.): William Nicolson
July 1702–13 November 1704 (d.): Joseph Fisher
28 March 1705 – 1735 (res.): George Fleming (also Dean of Carlisle from 1727)
March 1735–17 March 1743 (d.): William Fleming
21 April 1743 – 19 February 1756 (res.): Edmund Law
2 March 1756 – 18 May 1777 (d.): Venn Eyre
10 July 1777 – 5 August 1782 (res.): John Law
5 August 1782 – 29 January 1805 (res.): William Paley
29 January 1805 – 7 June 1827 (d.): Charles Anson
20 June 1827 – 18 November 1831 (res.): William Goodenough
10 February 1832 – 13 December 1854 (d.): William Goodenough (reinstated)
11 June 1855 – 1858: William Jackson

Late modern
1858–1867: William Phelps
1867–1882: Samuel Boutflower
1883–17 February 1920 (d.): Eustace Prescott
1920–17 June 1930 (d.): Ernest Campbell
1930–24 September 1933 (d.): Donald Campbell (son of Ernest)
1934–1944 (ret.): Grandage Powell, Bishop suffragan of Penrith
1944–1946 (res.): Geoffrey Warde
1947–October 1958 (ret.): Alexander Chisholm (afterwards archdeacon emeritus)
1958–1970 (res.): Charles Nurse (afterwards archdeacon emeritus)
1970–1978 (ret.): Richard Bradford (afterwards archdeacon emeritus)
1978–1984 (ret.): Walter Ewbank (afterwards archdeacon emeritus)
1984–1993 (ret.): Colin Stannard (afterwards archdeacon emeritus)
1993–5 May 2001 (d.): David Turnbull
2002–2008 (res.): David Thomson
2009–31 March 2016 (res.): Kevin Roberts
2016–2017: Chris Sims (Acting)
JuneJuly 2016 (archdeacon-designate): Jonathan Brewster (announced and withdrew)
25 February 201731 December 2022 (res.): Lee Townend

References

Sources

Anglican ecclesiastical offices
 
Church of England
Diocese of Carlisle
Lists of Anglicans
Lists of English people